Guardian is a 3D shoot 'em up video game.  It was released in 1993 for the Amiga CD32 game console and later converted to the Amiga 1200.  Originally previewed in the press under the name SibWing with similarities to the Super NES game Star Fox, the final game was a 3D update of the 1981 arcade game Defender.

Guardian is one of the few Amiga CD32 games to be programmed for the CD32 first and then ported in stripped-down form to the Amiga computers.

Reception
Guardian was lauded by Amiga Power. In the penultimate issue of the publication in August 1996, Guardian was rated the third best Amiga game ever in a Top 100 feature compiled by Amiga Power staff past and present. this references this page.

References

External links

Guardian (CD32) on Hall of Light

1994 video games
Amiga games
Amiga 1200 games
Amiga CD32 games
Original Xbox Live Arcade games
Video games developed in New Zealand
Single-player video games